G 185-32, also known by the variable star designation PY Vulpeculae, is a white dwarf in the constellation Vulpecula. Located approximately  distant, the stellar remnant is a ZZ Ceti variable, varying by 0.02 apparent magnitudes from the mean of 13.00.

Observational history
This star was first noticed during a survey for high proper motion stars by Henry L. Giclas, at Lowell Observatory, who listed it as a suspected white dwarf. The white dwarf designation was  confirmed spectroscopically in 1970 by astronomer Jesse L. Greenstein of the California Institute of Technology.

References

Vulpecula
Pulsating white dwarfs
Vulpeculae, PY
1241